Daniel Feeney (born May 29, 1994) is an American football guard for the Miami Dolphins of the National Football League (NFL). He played college football at Indiana, and was drafted by the Los Angeles Chargers in the third round of the 2017 NFL Draft.

High school
Feeney was a one-year letterman in volleyball and four year letterman for the Carl Sandburg High School Eagles football team, where he was named team MVP in his junior year, playing on both the offensive and defensive lines.

Feeney received offers from Illinois and Western Michigan, but committed to Indiana in the summer of 2011.

College career
Feeney set records in his freshman year in 2012, by starting all 12 games and earned honorable mention All-Big Ten honors at right guard, and did not allow a single sack all season. He suffered a Lisfranc fracture during a scrimmage that would cause him to miss the entire 2013 season. Feeney was redshirted to maintain three years of eligibility.

Feeney returned in 2014 to what ESPN termed "the B1G's most underrated position group". He started all 12 games in a year where Indiana set program single-season records with 3,163 rushing yards, led by 2,036 yards from Heisman candidate Tevin Coleman.

Ahead of his redshirt junior season in 2015, Feeney was named to the Lombardi Award and Outland Trophy watch lists. At the end of the season, Feeney earned consensus first-team All-American honors from ESPN, CBS Sports, the Associated Press and Sports Illustrated.

Prior to the start of the 2016 season, Feeney announced he would be returning for his senior year. On September 10, 2016, Feeney suffered a concussion while playing against Ball State. Feeney would be medically cleared to return to action prior to the Hoosiers game against Maryland on October 29, 2016. On November 30, 2016, Feeney was named First-team All-Big Ten. At the end of the season, Feeney earned his second All-American Team honors by the Associated Press.

Professional career
In June 2016, Feeney was labelled the “best interior offensive lineman” prospect in the 2017 NFL Draft by NFL analyst Lance Zierlein. After completing his senior season in 2016, Feeney entered the draft and was projected by NFL draft experts and scouts to be a second round pick. He received an invitation to the NFL combine and completed all of the required combine and positional drills. On March 31, 2017, he participated at Indiana's pro day, along with Devine Redding and six other prospects. He opted to only perform positional drills for scouts and team representatives from 27 NFL teams looked on, including offensive line coaches from the Philadelphia Eagles, Buffalo Bills, Miami Dolphins, and Detroit Lions. He was ranked the second best offensive guard prospect in the draft by NFLDraftScout.com, ESPN, and NFL analyst Mike Mayock.

Los Angeles Chargers
The Los Angeles Chargers selected Feeney in the third round (71st overall) of the 2017 NFL Draft. Feeney was the second guard the Los Angeles Chargers selected in the draft, behind Forrest Lamp (second round, 38th overall). He was also the fourth offensive guard and the fifth interior offensive lineman selected in the 2017 NFL Draft.

On June 2, 2017, the Los Angeles Chargers signed Feeney signed a four-year contract worth $3.7 million, with a $924,632 signing bonus.

He competed with Forrest Lamp, Matt Slauson, Brett Boyko, Donavon Clark, and Kenny Wiggins throughout training camp for a starting guard position. Head coach Anthony Lynn named him the backup right guard to Kenny Wiggins after Forrest Lamp tore his ACL and was placed on injured/reserve for the season.

He made his professional regular season debut during the Los Angeles Chargers season-opening 21-24 loss to the Denver Broncos. On October 29, 2017, Feeney earned his first career start at left guard during a 13-21 loss to the New England Patriots after Matt Slauson suffered a season-ending biceps injury. He ended up starting the rest of the season at left guard, and was named to the PFWA All-Rookie Team.

Feeney entered 2018 as the starting left guard, where he started all 16 games.

New York Jets
On March 19, 2021, Feeney signed a one-year contract with the New York Jets. He played in 16 games during the 2021 season, starting five. On March 16, 2022, he re-signed with the Jets on a one-year deal.

Miami Dolphins
On March 17, 2023, Feeney signed a one-year contract with the Miami Dolphins.

Personal life
Feeney is the son of Tony and Kim Feeney, and has a sister, Shannon Feeney. He currently donates to the MS society.

References

External links
 Indiana Hoosiers Profile

1994 births
Living people
People from Orland Park, Illinois
Players of American football from Illinois
Sportspeople from Cook County, Illinois
American football offensive guards
Indiana Hoosiers football players
Los Angeles Chargers players
New York Jets players
Miami Dolphins players